Bruno Gustavo Aparecido da Silva (born 16 March 1990) is a Brazilian mixed martial artist who competes in the Flyweight division of the Ultimate Fighting Championship. As of March 13, 2023, he is #15 in the UFC flyweight rankings.

Mixed martial arts career

Early career 
Starting his career in 2011, Silva racked up a 7–2–1 record in his native Brazil before trying out for The Ultimate Fighter: Brazil 4 in late 2014.

TUF Brazil 4
In the preliminary bout for the season, Silva faced Gustavo Sedório. Silva won the fight via first-round technical knockout due to a jaw injury Sedório suffered.

In the quarterfinals Silva faced Dileno Lopes. Silva lost the bout via first-round submission and was eliminated from the tournament.

Post-TUF career
After the season Silva moved to Arizona in 2015 in order to train at Fight Ready MMA. He competed mostly in United States, racking up 3–1–1 with his most memorable fights being winning the World Fighting Federation Flyweight title and also a draw against fellow future UFC fighter, Casey Kenney at LFA 11.

Ultimate Fighting Championship 
Silva was scheduled to face Khalid Taha on 7 September 2019 at UFC 242.  However, on 21 August, it was reported that the bout was moved to UFC 243. He lost the fight via submission in round three. On 23 December 2019 Taha received a one year USADA suspension for tested positive for  furosemide (diuretics} in an in-competition urine sample provided on 6 October 2019 where Taha took a medicine for reducing inflammation and swelling in his eyes which contained furosemide. The fight was overturned to a no contest.

Silva was scheduled to face Su Mudaerji in a flyweight bout at UFC Fight Night: Lee vs. Oliveira on 14 March 2020. However, due to the COVID-19 pandemic in mainland China, Mudaerji was forced to withdraw from the event as he would not travel to prepare for the fight and was replaced by promotional newcomer David Dvořák. He lost the fight via unanimous decision.

Silva was scheduled to face Tagir Ulanbekov on 12 September 2020 at UFC Fight Night: Waterson vs. Hill. However, due to travel restrictions related to the COVID-19 pandemic, the pairing was rescheduled and took place four weeks later at UFC Fight Night: Moraes vs. Sandhagen. He lost the fight by unanimous decision.

Silva faced JP Buys on 20 March 2021 at UFC on ESPN 21. After knocking Buys down multiple times during the bout, da Silva won the bout via technical knockout in the second round. This win earned him the Performance of the Night award.

Silva signed a new, four-fight deal with the organization.

Silva, replacing Denys Bondar, faced Victor Rodriguez on 22 May 2021 at UFC Fight Night: Font vs. Garbrandt. He won the fight via knockout a minute into the first round. This win earned him the Performance of the Night award.

Silva faced Tyson Nam on March 11, 2023, at UFC Fight Night 221. He won the fight via technical submission due to a rear-naked choke in round two. This win earned him the Performance of the Night award.

Championships and accomplishments 
Ultimate Fighting Championship
Performance of the Night (three times) 
World Fighting Federation
WFF Flyweight Championship (One time)

Mixed martial arts record 

|-
|Win
|align=center|13–5–2 (1)
|Tyson Nam
|Technical Submission (rear-naked choke)
|UFC Fight Night: Yan vs. Dvalishvili
|
|align=center|2
|align=center|1:23
|Las Vegas, Nevada, United States
|
|-
|Win
|align=center|12–5–2 (1)
|Victor Rodriguez
|KO (punches)
|UFC Fight Night: Font vs. Garbrandt 
|
|align=center|1
|align=center|1:00
|Las Vegas, Nevada, United States
|
|-
| Win
| align=center| 11–5–2 (1)
|JP Buys
|TKO (punches)
|UFC on ESPN: Brunson vs. Holland
|
|align=center|2
|align=center|2:56
|Las Vegas, Nevada, United States
|
|-
| Loss
| align=center| 10–5–2 (1)
| Tagir Ulanbekov	
| Decision (unanimous)
|UFC Fight Night: Moraes vs. Sandhagen
|
|align=center|3
|align=center|5:00
|Abu Dhabi, United Arab Emirates
|
|-
| Loss
| align=center| 10–4–2 (1)
| David Dvořák
| Decision (unanimous)
|UFC Fight Night: Lee vs. Oliveira
|
|align=center|3
|align=center|5:00
|Brasília, Brazil
|
|-
| NC
| align=center| 10–3–2 (1)
| Khalid Taha
|NC (overturned)
|UFC 243 
|
|align=center|3
|align=center|3:00
|Melbourne, Australia
|
|-
| Win
| align=center| 
| Ralph Acosta
| Decision (unanimous)
| World Fighting Federation 40
| 
| align=center|3
| align=center|5:00
| Chandler, Arizona, United States
| 
|-
| Win
| align=center| 9–3–2
| Joe Madrid
| TKO (punches)
| World Fighting Federation 35
| 
| align=center| 1
| align=center| 4:23
| Chandler, Arizona, United States
| 
|-
| Draw
| align=center| 8–3–2
| Casey Kenney
| Draw (split)
| LFA 11
| 
| align=center| 3
| align=center| 5:00
| Phoenix, Arizona, United States
| 
|-
| Loss
| align=center| 8–3–1
| Adalto Prado
| KO (head kick)
| Aspera FC 44
| 
| align=center| 1
| align=center| 0:07
| São Pedro, São Paulo, Brazil
| 
|-
| Win
| align=center|8–2–1
| Matt Betzold
| Decision (split)
| World Fighting Federation 25
| 
| align=center|3
| align=center|5:00
| Chandler, Arizona, United States
|
|-
| Win
| align=center|7–2–1
| Heider Prais
| Submission (rear-naked choke)
| Team Nogueira: MMA Fight Live
| 
| align=center|3
| align=center|3:23
| Rio de Janeiro, Brazil
|
|-
| Win
| align=center|6–2–1
| Soslenis Silva
| Submission (rear-naked choke)
| Talent MMA Circuit 8
| 
| align=center|3
| align=center|4:33
| Valinhos, Brazil
|
|-
| Win
| align=center|5–2–1
| Júlio Cesar Moraes
| KO (spinning wheel kick)
| Team Nogueira: MMA Circuit 4
| 
| align=center|3
| align=center|0:00
| Rio de Janeiro, Brazil
|
|-
| Win
| align=center| 4–2–1
| Atila Oliveira
| Decision (unanimous)
| MMA Challenge: Ponte Preta
| 
| align=center|3
| align=center|5:00
| Campinas, Brazil
| 
|-
| Draw
| align=center| 3–2–1
| Yury Valenzuela
| Draw (majority)
| Encontro Fight 2
| 
| align=center|3
| align=center|5:00
| Santa Bárbara d'Oeste, Brazil
| 
|-
| Loss
| align=center| 3–2
| Wesley Batista
| Decision (unanimous)
| Corumbatai Fight
| 
| align=center|3
| align=center|5:00
| Corumbataí, Brazil
| 
|-
| Win
| align=center| 3–1
| James Carvalho
| TKO (doctor stoppage)
| Arena Fight Uberlandia 4
| 
| align=center| 1
| align=center| 5:00
| Uberlândia, Brazil
| 
|-
| Loss
| align=center| 2–1
| Rodrigo Marcos
| Submission (armbar)
| Hombres de Honor 29
| 
| align=center| 3
| align=center| 0:22
| Sorocaba, Brazil
| 
|-
| Win
| align=center| 2–0
| Renato Higen Carriel
| Decision (unanimous)
| Circuito MMA Kyokushinkaikan 2
| 
| align=center|3
| align=center|5:00
| Sorocaba, Brazil
|
|-
| Win
| align=center| 1–0
| Paulo Magueta
| Submission
| Circuito MMA Kyokushinkaikan
| 
| align=center| 1
| align=center| 1:31
| Sorocaba, Brazil
|

Mixed martial arts exhibition record

|-
|Loss
|align=center| 1–1
| Dileno Lopes
| Submission (guillotine choke)
| The Ultimate Fighter: Brazil 4
| (airdate)
|align=center|1
|align=center|1:05
|Las Vegas, Nevada, United States
|
|- 
|Win 
|align=center| 1–0
| Gustavo Sedório
| TKO (jaw injury)
| The Ultimate Fighter: Brazil 4
| (airdate)
|align=center|1
|align=center|5:00
|Las Vegas, Nevada, United States
|
|-

See also 
 List of current UFC fighters
 List of male mixed martial artists

References

External links 
 
  
 
 

1990 births
Living people
Brazilian male mixed martial artists
Flyweight mixed martial artists
Mixed martial artists utilizing Brazilian jiu-jitsu
Ultimate Fighting Championship male fighters
Brazilian practitioners of Brazilian jiu-jitsu
People awarded a black belt in Brazilian jiu-jitsu
Sportspeople from São Paulo (state)
People from Piracicaba